Formula One, abbreviated to F1, is the highest class of open-wheeled auto racing series managed by the Fédération Internationale de l'Automobile (FIA), motorsport's world governing body. The "formula" in the name alludes to a series of FIA rules to which all participants and vehicles are required to conform. Each Grand Prix meeting occurs over three days with either two or three practice sessions before a three-part qualifying session on either Friday or Saturday to set the starting order for Saturday's sprint session (to set the race's final starting positions) or Sunday's race.  are frequently named after the country, region or city in which they are raced, and in some seasons, nations have hosted more than one event. Should Formula One hold two or more races in the same nation in the same year, either on a different circuit or the same one, then their Grand Prix names will be different. The results of each Grand Prix held over the course of the season are combined to determine two annual championships, one for drivers and one for constructors.

Grand Prix distance regulations have varied throughout Formula One history. The exception to the rule is the Monaco Grand Prix, which has a scheduled length of at least . No race can last more than two hours if it goes unhalted.

The British Grand Prix and Italian Grand Prix are the most frequently held events in the Formula One World Championship with 73 editions each since the races first formed a part of the series in 1950, followed by the Monaco Grand Prix which has been held 68 times, all on the same course, the Circuit de Monaco. Italy's Monza Circuit has hosted the most  on any circuit with 72. The Circuit de Monaco is second with 68 events and the Silverstone Circuit in the United Kingdom is third with 57 races. Italy has held the most  with 103 since its first in 1950. Only Morocco and Qatar have staged just one Grand Prix.

 1,081 World Championship events have been held over 73 seasons in 34 countries and under 53 race titles at 76 racing circuits. These figures include the Indianapolis 500 races which were a part of the World Championships from  until  despite not being named a Grand Prix. The  was the first Formula One World Championship Grand Prix.

Active and past races

By race title
Races have been held under 53 race titles

By host nation

There have been 34 countries that have hosted a Formula One World Championship race,

By venue

A total of 76 circuits have hosted a Formula One World Championship race,

Milestone races

Multiples of 100

Notes

References

Bibliography

External links
 Formula One official website
 FIA official website

 
Grand Prix
Formula One